The Virginia Slims of Pennsylvania, also known as the VS of Pennsylvania, is a defunct WTA Tour affiliated women's tennis tournament played from 1983 to 1986. It was held at the Hershey Racquet Club in Hershey, Pennsylvania in the United States and played on indoor carpet courts.

Robin White was the most successful player at the tournament, winning the singles and doubles competitions in 1985. She partnered American Mary Lou Piatek in the doubles competition.

Results

Singles

Doubles

References
 WTA Results Archive

External links

 
Carpet court tennis tournaments
Indoor tennis tournaments
Defunct tennis tournaments in the United States
1983 establishments in Pennsylvania
1986 disestablishments in Pennsylvania